The wedge-tailed grass finch (Emberizoides herbicola) is a species of bird in the family Thraupidae; it was formerly placed in the Emberizidae. It is found in Argentina, Bolivia, Brazil, Colombia, Costa Rica, Ecuador, French Guiana, Guyana, Panama, Paraguay, Peru, Suriname, Uruguay, and Venezuela.

Its major range is in southeastern South America in southern Brazil, Bolivia, eastern Paraguay, and extreme northeast Argentina in the cerrado, pantanal, and southern caatinga; it also ranges into northern Colombia with central Venezuela, and the Atlantic coastal Guianas, as well as Ilha de Marajo at the Amazon River outlet. Its natural habitats are dry savanna, subtropical or tropical seasonally wet or flooded lowland grassland, and heavily degraded former forest.

Gallery

References

External links
Wedge-tailed grass finch videos on the Internet Bird Collection
Wedge-tailed grass finch photo gallery VIREO Photo
Photo; Article – geometer–"Brazil Photos"

wedge-tailed grass finch
Birds of Colombia
Birds of Venezuela
Birds of the Guianas
Birds of Brazil
Birds of the Cerrado
Birds of the Pantanal
Birds of Bolivia
Birds of Paraguay
Birds described in 1817
Articles containing video clips
Taxa named by Louis Jean Pierre Vieillot
Birds of the Amazon Basin

Taxonomy articles created by Polbot